Tsay Keh Dene, meaning "people of the rocks" in the Sekani language, may mean:

 Sekani people of northern British Columbia, Canada
 Tsay Keh Dene First Nation, the band government of the Sekani people
 Sekani language

Language and nationality disambiguation pages